Nebraska Admiral (formally, Admiral in the Great Navy of the State of Nebraska) is the state of Nebraska's highest civic honor, and an honorary title bestowed upon individuals by approval of the Governor of Nebraska, a triply landlocked U.S. state. It is not a military rank, requires no specific duties, and carries with it no pay or any other compensation. Admirals have the option of joining the Nebraska Admirals Association, a non-profit organization that promotes "The Good Life" of Nebraska.

The award certificate describes the honor in a deliberately tongue-in-cheek fashion:

The use of the title of admiral, instead of some other high-ranking military title, is a humorous reference to the fact that Nebraska has no navy; it is the only triple-landlocked state in the US and only 0.68% of the state is water, the fifth-lowest percentage in the nation. Nebraska relies on the United States Armed Forces for its defense and has had no active state defense force of any sort since 1972.

History 

The Great Navy of the State of Nebraska was created in 1931. The Lieutenant Governor of Nebraska at that time, Theodore W. Metcalfe, was serving as Acting Governor of Nebraska while Governor Charles W. Bryan was outside the state. At the urging of some of his friends, he appointed "20 to 25 prominent Nebraskans" as Nebraska Admirals.

Commissions in the Nebraska Navy have always been given to prominent citizens both inside and outside of Nebraska. However, anyone can request or be nominated for an admiralship as long as he or she has "contributed in some way to the state, promote the Good Life in Nebraska, and warrant recognition as determined by the Governor".

Charitable activities 
The Nebraska Admirals Association was established in 1986. It is a 501(c)(3) non-profit organization that is devoted to a number of causes, including promoting Nebraska products, educational activities, awarding scholarships, promoting tourism, and providing support for ships and sailors in the United States Navy named after Nebraska-related entities.

Current guidelines for Admiralships 
As of January 2015, Governor Pete Ricketts requires the following criteria for awarding an Admiralship: 
 The nominator or nominee must be a resident of Nebraska.
 Self-nominations will not be honored.
 Those who are nominating persons for Admiralships will need to send the request by U.S. postal mail or present it to the Governor's Office. E-mail requests will not be accepted. All requests must be in writing.
 If the date for the Admiralship is not specifically requested, the received date will be used on the certificate.
 The Governor retains full discretion for any Admiralship requests.
 The Governor's Office requests notice of two to three weeks to process Admiralships.

Notable admirals 
Notable admirals include:

 Gene Autry
 Jack Benny
 George W. Bush
 Johnny Carson
 Dick Cavett
 Bing Crosby
 John Charles Daly
 Sandy Dennis
 Costa Dillon
 Elizabeth II
 Julius "Dr. J" Erving
 Eileen Farrell
 Craig Ferguson
 Gerald Ford
 George Gallup
 Bill Gates
 John Glenn
 Chuck Hagel
 Sir Edmund Hillary
 Bob Hope
 Chuck Jones
 Dorothy Kilgallen
 Martin Luther King III
 Ann Landers
 David Letterman
 Douglas MacArthur
 Bill Murray
 Ben Nelson
 Jack Nicklaus
 Tom Osborne
 Arnold Palmer
 Ronald Reagan
 Franklin D. Roosevelt
 Julie Schmit-Albin
 Roger Smith
 Mark Spitz
 Harry S. Truman

Controversial admiralships
Equatorial Guinea President Teodoro Obiang Nguema Mbasogo and former Gambian President Yahya Jammeh were both reportedly granted a Nebraska Admiralship. Both Nguema and Jammeh have been criticized for their dictatorial rule over their respective countries, and the reported granting of the admiralship to Jammeh by Governor Dave Heineman drew the criticism of the state's Democratic Party leader.

Governor Pete Ricketts revoked admiralship from two women, Amanda Gailey and Courtney Lawton, in January 2018, less than a month after the award. The honor was revoked, according to the governor's spokesman, because the two had protested the appearance of Turning Point USA, a conservative group that maintains a Professor Watchlist, on the campus of the University of Nebraska–Lincoln. The governor's office had no enforcement power to retrieve the certificates presented to Gailey and Lawton.

See also 
 Admiral
 Kentucky Colonel
 Rhode Island Commodore
 USS Nebraska
 Sagamore of the Wabash

References

External links 
Nebraska Admirals Association
Lincoln Journal Star article "Admirals celebrate 20 years of service"

Honorary titles of the United States
Government of Nebraska
Nebraska culture
State awards and decorations of the United States
1931 introductions